Sulaimon Runsewe (born 7 August 2001) is a Nigerian cricketer. In October 2019, he was named in Nigeria's squad for the 2019 ICC T20 World Cup Qualifier tournament in the United Arab Emirates. He made his Twenty20 International (T20I) debut for Nigeria, against Jersey, on 19 October 2019. In December 2019, he was named in Nigeria's squad for the 2020 Under-19 Cricket World Cup.

References

External links
 

2001 births
Living people
Nigerian cricketers
Nigeria Twenty20 International cricketers
Place of birth missing (living people)